Theuderic IV (c. 712 – 737) or Theuderich, Theoderic, or Theodoric; in French, Thierry was the Merovingian King of the Franks from 721 until his death in 737. He was the son of king Dagobert III.

During his reign, his realm was controlled by the mayor of the palace, Charles Martel, who kept him in custody, first in Chelles Abbey, then in Château-Thierry.

After his death, the Frankish throne remained vacant for seven years, until Pepin the Short arranged for Childeric III, the last Merovingian king, to succeed him. Theuderic IV may have been the father of Childeric III, but this remains uncertain.

References

Sources

Merovingian kings

710s births
Year of birth uncertain

737 deaths

Rois fainéants
8th-century Frankish kings
Burials at the Basilica of Saint-Denis